Antonio Criniti (born 29 October 1970) is a retired Italian football striker.

References

1970 births
Living people
Italian footballers
U.S. Catanzaro 1929 players
Cagliari Calcio players
Palermo F.C. players
U.S. Avellino 1912 players
Brescia Calcio players
Reggina 1914 players
U.S. Triestina Calcio 1918 players
Vis Pesaro dal 1898 players
Catania S.S.D. players
A.S. Sambenedettese players
A.C. Perugia Calcio players
Atletico Roma F.C. players
S.S.D. Varese Calcio players
Association football forwards
Serie A players